Tengiz Sigua (9 November 1934 – 21 January 2020) was a Georgian politician who served as Prime Minister of Georgia from 1992 to 1993.

Sigua was an engineer by profession and entered politics on the eve of the Soviet Union's collapse. In 1990 he led an expert group of the bloc "Round Table-Free Georgia". Following the first multiparty elections in Georgia, he was elected Chair of the Ministers' Council of the Georgian Soviet Socialist Republic on 14 November 1990.

He was the prime minister in Zviad Gamsakhurdia's government from 15 November 1990 to 18 August 1991. However, he resigned in August 1991 after disagreements with the president. He later remarked that the newspapers used to call Gamsakhurdia "Caucasian Saddam Hussein". Along with the National Guard leader Tengiz Kitovani and the paramilitary leader Jaba Ioseliani, he became a leader of the uneasy opposition which launched a violent coup against the President in December 1991-January 1992. After Gamsakhurdia's fall, he became Prime Minister in the Georgian interim government (Military Council, later transformed into the State Council) which was joined by Eduard Shevardnadze) on 6 January 1992. He was reappointed Prime Minister on 8 November 1992 by the newly elected Parliament.

He resigned on 6 August 1993 after the Parliament rejected the budget submitted by the government. He remained as an MP, led the National Liberation Front opposition party and backed a military solution of the Georgian-Abkhaz conflict.

In an interview with the Russian news agency Ria Novosti, Sigua accused the Georgian side of starting the 2008 war: "We started the war in 2008. We started to shell Tskhinvali and this, after the death of Russian peacekeepers, gave Russian troops the right to actively interfere".

See also 
List of Georgians
Prime Minister of Georgia

References

Prime Ministers of Georgia
Leaders who took power by coup
1934 births
2020 deaths
Mingrelians
People from Racha-Lechkhumi and Kvemo Svaneti
1990s in Georgia (country)
20th-century politicians from Georgia (country)
Heads of government of the Georgian Soviet Socialist Republic